HMS Amphion (P439), was an Amphion-class submarine of the Royal Navy, built by Vickers Armstrong and launched 31 August 1944.

HMS Amphion, later S43, was the first of the class to be launched in August 1944. She was originally to be named as HMS Anchorite but their names were exchanged before launch. Of the class, only Amphion and HMS Astute were completed before the end of the war, and neither were involved in hostilities. In 1953 she took part in the Fleet Review to celebrate the Coronation of Queen Elizabeth II.

Design
Like all Amphion-class submarines, Amphion had a displacement of  when at the surface and  while submerged. The submarine was powered by two Admiralty ML eight-cylinder diesel engines generating a power of  each. It also contained four electric motors each producing  that drove two shafts.

Amphion was fitted with ten  torpedo tubes, one QF 4 inch naval gun Mk XXIII, one Oerlikon 20 mm cannon, and a .303 British Vickers machine gun. Its torpedo tubes were fitted to the bow and stern, and it could carry twenty torpedoes. Its complement was sixty-one crew members.

References

Publications

External links
 Pictures of HMS Amphion at Maritime Quest

 

Amphion-class submarines
Cold War submarines of the United Kingdom
Ships built in Barrow-in-Furness
1944 ships
Maritime incidents in 1967